YW may refer to:
 ywfromthe6ix (Toronto Chinese Rapper YW)
 Yw (digraph)
 Air Nostrum (IATA code YW)
 Yreka Western Railroad (reporting mark YW)
 Y-Wing, a Star Wars starfighter
 YW, the United States Navy hull classification symbol for "water barge"
 Yottawatt, or 1024 watt